Pretoria North High School is a public funded government high school in Pretoria, Gauteng, South Africa

History of Schools in Pretoria North

The first school in the area was established in 1890 by Theodore Erasmus at his farm " Wesfontein ". In 1895 Jan Booysen established a school on the east side of the Apies River, Pretoria. Since 1904 the English Anglican Church in General Beyers Street has been used as a school. The first classrooms of the Pretoria North Parallel Medium School (Primary Danie Malan today) were founded on 20 May 1909.

Pretoria North High School founded

On January 19, 1943, the Junior High School Pretoria North seceded from Pretoria North Parallel and the standard six to eight students went over to House Zealand. The construction of the school started in 1944 and was completed in 1946. Pretoria North High School was officially founded in 1951.

Language and gender 

The school caters for both sexes, and is an Afrikaans medium school

Alumni 
 Carl Martin (Kallie) Kriel (born 14 September 1969) -  Head of a civic organization

References

High schools in South Africa
Schools in Pretoria